Portrait of the Artist with his Family is a c.1615 painting by Jacob Jordaens of himself and his family. With Group Portrait, The Apostles Paul and Barnabas at Lystra (c.1618) and The Banquet of Cleopatra, it is one of four works by the artist in the Hermitage Museum.

In the 18th century, the work was owned by the Duke of Portland before entering Robert Walpole's collection at Houghton Hall. After his death, it was sold to the Hermitage Museum in 1779 during the reign of Catherine II of Russia. At that time. it was misattributed to Jordaens' father-in-law Adam van Noort. Later, the figures were reidentified - the one on the left playing the lute is Jordaens beside his father, whilst the artist's mother is to the left, surrounded by children and with her youngest daughter sitting on her knee. Two cherubs above symbolise the souls of dead children, whilst a servant brings in a platter of fruit.

References

Sources
 N. Smolskaïa, Jacob Jordaens, Moscow, 1959, p. 5. 
 W. von Bode, Die Meister der holländischen und flämischen Malerschulen, Leipzig, 1956, p. 516. 

1610s paintings
Paintings in the collection of the Hermitage Museum
Paintings by Jacob Jordaens
Jordaens
Group portraits
17th-century portraits
Angels in art
Dogs in art
Paintings of children